In Mandaeism, Nirig is the Mandaic name for the planet Mars. Nirig is one of the seven planets, who are part of the entourage of Ruha in the World of Darkness.

Nirig, who is also called Marik, is associated with Islam, as well as with war and violence. Nirig's name is derived from the Akkadian Nergallu.

References

Planets in Mandaeism
Mars in culture